Trevor Charles Horn  (born 15 July 1949) is an English music producer, label and recording studio owner, musician and composer. He is best known for his production work in the 1980s, and for being one half of the new wave band the Buggles (with Geoff Downes). Horn took up the bass guitar at an early age and taught himself the instrument and to sight-read music. In the 1970s, he worked as a session musician, built his own studio, and wrote and produced singles for various artists.

Horn and Downes gained international fame in 1979 with the Buggles' hit single "Video Killed the Radio Star". This was followed by their one-year tenure with the progressive rock band Yes, with Horn becoming their lead singer. In 1981, Horn became a full-time producer, working on commercially successful songs and albums for numerous artists, among them Dollar, ABC, Malcolm McLaren, Yes, and Frankie Goes to Hollywood. He ventured into business with his wife Jill Sinclair, purchasing Sarm West Studios and establishing the publishers Perfect Songs and their own label, ZTT Records. In the following year, Horn co-formed the electronic group Art of Noise. In the 1990s, Horn's success continued with his association with Seal. He has been a member of the supergroup Producers, later known as the Trevor Horn Band, since 2006.

Horn has won numerous awards, including three Brit Awards for Best British Producer in 1983, 1985, and 1992. He won a Grammy Award for producing Seal's 1994 hit "Kiss from a Rose." In 2010, Horn received an Ivor Novello Award for Outstanding Contribution to British Music. His influence on pop and electronic music in the 1980s was such that he has been called "The Man Who Invented the Eighties".

Early life
Trevor Charles Horn was born on 15 July 1949 to John and Elizabeth Horn in Hetton Le Hole, in the North East of England and grew up near the Stonebridge Pub, Durham City. The second of four children, Horn has two sisters, including novelist Marjorie DeLuca, and a brother, Ken Horn. His father was a maintenance engineer at the neighbouring dairy and a semi-professional musician who played the double bass in the Joe Clarke Big Band during the week. Horn attended Johnston Grammar School in Durham.

At around eight years of age, Horn took up the double bass and was taught the basics by his father, including the concept of playing triads. He then taught himself the bass guitar and became confident in sight-reading music, using guide books and practising on his father's four-string guitar in the spare room of the house. In his early teens, Horn would fill in for his father on the double bass in the Joe Clarke band when he was late for a gig. At school Horn was given a recorder which he picked up with little effort as he already had music knowledge, and performed in the local youth orchestra. His interests soon turned to contemporary rock acts such as the Beatles, the Rolling Stones, and Bob Dylan. At fourteen Horn played electric guitar in his first group, the Outer Limits, named after the 1963 television series of the same name, playing mainly covers by the Kinks.

Horn went on to pursue a "succession of day jobs", including one at a rubber company. He also put on a Bob Dylan imitation act for two nights a week "with a harmonica around my neck", and played the bass at odd gigs. Then, at seventeen, Horn decided to pursue a career in music and "woke my parents up at 4am to tell them". They were reluctant at first as they wanted him to become a chartered accountant as he performed well in maths, but Horn had failed the required exams. Horn's parents pleaded with him to try one more job, but three months into his role as a progress chaser in a plastic bag factory, he was fired. "I said, 'That's it, I'm never going into that world again!'", and the next day, received an offer to play the bass in a local semi-professional band at a Top Rank Ballroom, playing top 40 and dance music for £24 a week for five nights' work. Horn also received airplay on BBC Radio Leicester, performing self-written songs on a guitar.

Career

1971–1979: Early work
At 21, Horn relocated to London and took up work by playing in a band which involved re-recording top 20 songs for BBC radio due to the needle time restrictions then in place. This was followed by a one-year tenure with Ray McVay's big band, and earning as a session musician, producing jingles, records, and working with rock groups. His time with Ray McVay included performances at the world ballroom dancing championship and the television show Come Dancing. At 24, Horn began a period of work in Leicester where his growing interest in recording studios led to his assistance in the construction of a studio in the city, while playing the bass at Bailey's club for seven nights for money. Upon completion of the studio, Horn produced songs for local artists, including a song for Leicester City F.C.

By 1976, Horn had returned to London. He played bass in Northern Lights, a covers band, which also featured keyboardist Geoff Downes and disco singer Tina Charles. Horn went on to form Tracks, a jazz fusion band inspired by Weather Report and Herbie Hancock, with future Shakatak drummer Roger Odell, before he left the group to play in Tina Charles's backing band. The two entered a short relationship, and Horn learned a lot from her inspiring producer Biddu. Also featured in Charles's band were Horn's future Buggles partners, keyboardist Geoffrey Downes and guitarist Bruce Woolley.

In the mid-1970s, Horn worked for a music publishers on Denmark Street in London, producing demos which sometimes had Horn in charge of producing a master if a deal for a demo was made. From 1977 to 1979, Horn worked on various singles either as a songwriter, producer, or orchestra director, "without ever making any money out of it". Among his first was "Natural Dance" by Tony Cole and "Don't Come Back" by Fallen Angel and the T.C. Band, featuring Woolley as songwriter, which Horn produced under the name "T.C. Horn". He wrote "Boot Boot Woman", the B-side to the Boogatti single "Come Back Marianne", under his real name. In 1978, Horn wrote, sang, and produced "Caribbean Air Control" under the pseudonym Big A, which features Horn pictured as a pilot on the front sleeve. In 1979, a full studio album by Chromium, a "sci-fi disco project" named Star to Star was released that featured Horn and Downes as songwriters and producers, and Horn's future Art of Noise bandmate Anne Dudley on keyboards. Other artists that Horn worked with included Woolley, John Howard, Dusty Springfield ("Baby Blue"), and the Jags ("Back of My Hand"). Horn scored his first production hit when "Monkey Chop" by Dan-I reached No. 30 on the UK singles chart in 1979.

1978–1981: The Buggles and Yes

In 1978, Horn and Downes formed the new wave band the Buggles with early contributions from Woolley. They secured a recording deal with Island Records and spent much of 1979 recording their debut album, The Age of Plastic (1980). The credits list Horn with co-production, lead vocals, guitar and bass. Its lead single "Video Killed the Radio Star" was released in September 1979 and reached No. 1 in the UK, propelling Horn, then aged 30, and Downes to mainstream fame. In August 1981, the song was the first music video to air on MTV.

The success of "Video Killed the Radio Star" led to Horn and Downes to secure management from Brian Lane, who was also managing the progressive rock band Yes. They were in need of a singer and keyboardist following the departures of Jon Anderson and Rick Wakeman, which led to Horn and Downes pitching "We Can Fly from Here", a demo that they had written with Yes in mind. Both accepted to join Yes and work got underway on Drama (1980) with Horn on lead vocals and fretless bass. Horn spent much of his time on the album, and cut his wedding reception short in order to resume working on it. Horn sang on the band's 1980 tour of North America and the UK, after which he left to become a full-time producer.

In 1981, he completed a second Buggles album Adventures in Modern Recording largely on his own following Downes's decision to form Asia. Horn resumed working with Yes as a producer on their albums 90125 (1983) and Big Generator (1987). Horn rated "Owner of a Lonely Heart", the lead single from 90125, as technically his best work.

1981–present: Producer and other projects

1980s
In early 1981, Horn left Yes and became a full-time producer. His wife advised him to branch off from being an instrumental musician as he could reach greater success in production, and subsequently she became Horn's manager. He assembled a studio rig which included a Roland TR-808 drum machine and sequencer and a set of Simmons electronic drum modules. He spent £18,000 on a Fairlight CMI synthesiser, one of four in the country at the time. "I knew what it was capable of, because I understood what it did. Most other people didn't understand at the time – sampling was like a mystical world". Horn realised he needed full-time assistance in operating the machine and hired J. J. Jeczalik to programme it. For his use of the Fairlight, Horn is credited as the "key architect" in incorporating sampling into "the language of pop".

Horn had commercial success with his first project, The Dollar Album (1982) by pop duo Dollar, which his wife had assigned him to work on. He co-wrote and produced four songs that follow a love story across them: "Mirror Mirror", "Hand Held in Black and White", "Give Me Back My Heart", and "Videotheque". All four became top 20 hits in the UK. Horn's production style attracted interest from other bands, leading to even greater success with The Lexicon of Love (1982) by ABC, which reached No. 1 on the UK albums chart. It was during these sessions that Horn acquired a LinnDrum drum machine, and assembled a team that would characterise and define the sound of much of his work in the 1980s, with Dudley on keyboards and arrangements, Gary Langan and later Stephen Lipson as chief engineer, Jeczalik as programmer, backing vocalist Tessa Webb, and percussionist Luis Jardim.

In 1982, Horn and his wife formed a music publishing company, Perfect Songs. This coincided with their then recent acquisition of Basing Street Studios, which also housed the fledgling publishing company. Perfect Songs was able to harness and develop the up-and-coming young artists working in the recording studio. The first to be signed were Frankie Goes to Hollywood, followed by Art of Noise and Propaganda. These first few signings to the company were instrumental in establishing the company ethos of "innovation and artiste development, taking risks and signing acts far into the left field". In 1983, Horn and his wife purchased Basing Street Studios in west London from Chris Blackwell and renamed it Sarm West Studios. The deal included the rights for them to operate a record label through Island Record's distribution which led to the formation of ZTT Records with NME writer Paul Morley. It is named after the sound poem of the same name by Italian futurist Filippo Tommaso Marinetti.

During 1982 and 1983, Horn worked with Malcolm McLaren and Anne Dudley, writing numerous worldwide hits including "Buffalo Gals", "Double Dutch", "Duck for the Oyster" and the Duck Rock album.

In 1983, Horn also co-formed Art of Noise, co-writing several hits including "Close (To the Edit)", "Beat Box", "Moments in Love", and "Slave to the Rhythm". This was originally intended as Frankie Goes to Hollywood's second single, but was instead given to Grace Jones. Horn and his studio team reworked and reinterpreted it, jazz style, into six separate songs to form Jones's album Slave to the Rhythm. Horn got David Gilmour to play the guitar.

In 1984, Horn was approached by Bob Geldof to produce the song "Do They Know It's Christmas?", but he was unavailable. Instead, he gave use of Sarm West Studio free of charge to the project for 24 hours, which Geldof accepted, assigning Midge Ure as the producer instead. The song was recorded and mixed on 25 November. Horn produced the B-side featuring messages from artists who had and had not made the recording, including David Bowie, Annie Lennox, Paul McCartney, Big Country, and Holly Johnson. They were also recorded over the same backing track as the "Do They Know It's Christmas?"

Several musicians have described Horn's style of production as dominating. Frankie Goes to Hollywood's debut album Welcome to the Pleasuredome barely featured any of the band's performances, instead featuring Horn and session musicians (lead single "Relax" cost £70,000 spent across three sessions that included scrapped versions by the band and by Ian Dury's backing band, before Horn re-recorded the song himself); and the Pet Shop Boys remarked that although Horn had promised to complete their single "Left to My Own Devices" in a couple of weeks, it took several months for them to receive the final mix due to the lavish live orchestration and studio work.

In the late 1980s, Horn relocated to Bel Air, Los Angeles where he established Sarm West Coast LA, a residential recording studio.

1990s
In 1990, Horn produced English musician Seal's eponymous debut album. This began a multi-album collaboration which Horn reasoned down to his liking of Seal's voice and a "musical empathy" with how he works and the songs he writes. Seal reached No. 1 in the UK and lead single "Crazy" went to No. 2. The album marked a turning point in Horn's production method, switching typical studio hardware for computers, and recorded tracks on Seal using MIDI and Studio Vision software. Horn was pleased with the results and sold his PC equipment for an Apple Macintosh. At this stage of his career, Horn had lost his enthusiasm for producing 12-inch mixes of songs and brought in other remixers to make them, while concentrating on albums.

He also produced half of the songs on Marc Almond's 1991 album Tenement Symphony, including the three singles on the album: "Jacky", "My Hand Over My Heart" and "The Days of Pearly Spencer", which reached #4 in the UK charts.

In the 1990s, Horn wrote two songs for solo female singers. "Riding into Blue (Cowboy Song)" was recorded by Inga Humpe and "Docklands" was recorded by Betsy Cook. He also co-wrote two songs with Terry Reid for his 1991 album, The Driver and "The Shape of Things to Come" for Cher's 1995 album It's a Man's World.

Horn co-produced Mike Oldfield's 1992 album Tubular Bells II alongside Oldfield and Tom Newman. Oldfield was a fan of the Buggles song Video Killed The Radio Star and described Horn as like being a judge in a courtroom when presenting some of his ideas for the album, to which Horn would either nod or shake his head. This, according to Oldfield, gave him a kind of a filter, putting in ideas which worked and ejecting ideas which didn't work.

Horn co-wrote "Everybody Up", the theme song to the TV programme The Glam Metal Detectives, a comedy sketch show which appeared on BBC Two in 1995. This was another collaboration with Lol Creme.

Horn's songwriting can be heard on numerous film soundtracks. In 1992, Horn collaborated with composer Hans Zimmer to produce the score for the film Toys, which included interpretations by Tori Amos, Pat Metheny and Thomas Dolby.

In the mid-1990s, Horn bought Hook End Manor and renamed its recording facility Sarm Hook End. He put the property on sale in 2007 for £12 million and relocated to Primrose Hill in London.

In 1995, Horn produced "The Carpet Crawlers 1999", a rerecording of "The Carpet Crawlers" by Genesis which featured vocals from their former singers Peter Gabriel and Phil Collins. It was released on their Turn It On Again: The Hits (1999) box set.

In 1996, Horn produced the multi-platinum album Wildest Dreams by Tina Turner.

2000s
In the 2000s, Horn provided additional production on three international hits for t.A.T.u., "All the Things She Said", "Not Gonna Get Us", and "Clowns (Can You See Me Now)". He also produced the theme tune to the 2000 film Coyote Ugly, "Can't Fight the Moonlight", recorded by Leann Rimes, co-wrote "Pass the Flame" (the official torch relay song for the 2004 Olympics in Athens) in collaboration with Lol Creme and co-wrote the title track from Lisa Stansfield's 2004 album The Moment.

He co-wrote "Sound the Bugle", performed by Bryan Adams and featured on the Spirit: Stallion of the Cimarron soundtrack.
and: produced 3 tracks (La Sombra del Gigante, Un Angel No Es and Mujer Amiga Mia) of Stilelibero (Freestyle) Estilolibre by Eros Ramazzotti, released on 29 May 2001. 
On 11 November 2004, a Prince's Trust charity concert celebrating Horn's 25 years as a record producer took place at Wembley Arena. Performers at the show included the Buggles, Bruce Woolley, ABC, Art of Noise, Belle & Sebastian, Lisa Stansfield, Pet Shop Boys, Seal, Dollar, Propaganda, t.A.T.u., Yes, Grace Jones and Frankie Goes to Hollywood (with Ryan Molloy replacing original vocalist Holly Johnson). A double album, Produced by Trevor Horn, was released in conjunction with the concert. An edited version of the concert has been broadcast on television in several countries under the title 25 Years of Pop: Produced by Trevor Horn, and a DVD release of the full concert called Slaves to the Rhythm is available.

In 2006, Horn co-formed the supergroup Producers, in which Horn plays with various musicians/producers, namely Lol Creme, producer Steve Lipson, drummer Ash Soan and initially singer/songwriter Chris Braide. The band performed its first gig at the Camden Barfly in November 2006. They continue to perform, now under the name the Trevor Horn Band.

On 22 May 2006, the Pet Shop Boys released their album Fundamental which was produced by Horn. The album reached No. 5 in the UK chart. In the same month, he featured in a Pet Shop Boys concert specially recorded for BBC Radio 2. Horn produced an album version of the event, Concrete, released on 23 October 2006. Horn also produced Captain's debut album, This is Hazelville, released late 2006. In the same year, he also worked with British band Delays on their song "Valentine", which was released as the lead single from their album You See Colours. He has also worked with John Legend and David Jordan.

For the 2008 movie Wanted (starring James McAvoy and Angelina Jolie), Horn produced Danny Elfman's vocals on the closing credits song "The Little Things".

In 2009, Horn produced the album Reality Killed the Video Star for Robbie Williams. Aside from the album title paying homage to Horn's hit single with the Buggles back in 1979, it also reflects Horn and Williams' mutual disdain for the ongoing crop of reality television and music contest programmes in the UK and elsewhere. Ironically, the album was Williams' first studio album not to reach number 1 in the UK, beaten to the top spot by the debut album by JLS, who were runners-up on television's "The X Factor" in 2008.

2010s
Horn was also the executive producer of Jeff Beck's album, Emotion & Commotion, released in early 2010. He returned to work with Yes again, producing their new album from October 2010. That album, 2011's Fly From Here, is a reunion of sorts for Horn's former bandmate Geoff Downes; not only is Downes a member of the band's current incarnation, but the album also takes its title from a song written by Horn and Downes and performed by Yes during their original stint with the band in 1980.

In 2017, Horn wrote the music for the Stan Lee co-produced anime The Reflection, the soundtrack being released as the first album under Trevor Horn's name.

In January 2018, Horn played the bass with Dire Straits Legacy for their Brazilian tour. He continued to tour with the band throughout the year.

Horn re-mixed 2011's Fly From Here with Yes, adding new vocals and editing parts. The album is called Fly from Here – Return Trip and was released in March 2018. He has also been working on musicals, including one called "The Robot Sings".

In November 2018, Horn performed a one-off concert at the Queen Elizabeth Hall in London. Horn's new album, Trevor Horn Reimagines the Eighties, was released on 25 January 2019. A single, "Everybody Wants to Rule the World", with vocals by Robbie Williams, was released on 24 October 2018. Further guests include Rumer, All Saints, Simple Minds and Gabrielle Aplin.

Horn has been touring as the bass player in Dire Straits Legacy in 2019–20.

Influence

Musician Gary Barlow and producer Nigel Godrich cite Horn as an influence.
Musician DJ Shadow cites Horn as an influence.

Personal life
Horn met his future wife Jill Sinclair, a former mathematics teacher and business partner, in 1977. They married in 1980 and became business partners. They have four children: two sons, Aaron and Will, and two daughters, Gabriella and Alexandra, the latter of whom has worked as a trainee solicitor. Aaron (known in the industry as "Aaron Audio"), like his father, is a musician and producer. He was in the band Sam and the Womp and frequently DJs around London (he lives in north London). Both Aaron and Ally Horn are co-directors of Sarm Studios. , Horn has three grandsons. He is not Jewish, but has attended synagogue with his children, who were raised in his wife's faith. In a 2019 interview, he said that he "believes in [Judaism] more than anything else".

On 25 June 2006, while at home from Goldsmiths College, University of London, Aaron was practising with his air rifle, not realising his mother was close by. A 4.5 mm (.177 calibre) air gun pellet accidentally hit Sinclair in the neck, severing an artery and causing irreversible brain damage from hypoxia, leaving only her lower brain functions and no chance for recovery. She was taken to the Royal Berkshire Hospital intensive care unit where her condition was described as "critical but stable". Communication from ZTT Records confirmed on 1 September 2006 that Sinclair was in a natural coma and had been moved to a rehabilitation centre. In September 2009, Horn told The Times confirmed that she was still in a coma. In June 2012, Horn told The Sunday Times that his wife was not in a coma, but, "She cannot speak, move, or smile. The only expression she can show is of discomfort."  Sinclair died of cancer on 22 March 2014, aged 61.

In late 2017, Horn's home and recording studio in the Bel Air neighbourhood of Los Angeles were destroyed by the Skirball Fire. Horn indicated via Twitter that he intended to rebuild at the property.

Discography

Awards
 BRIT Award 1983 – Best British Producer
 BRIT Award 1985 – Best British Producer
 BRIT Award 1992 – Best British Producer
 Grammy Award 1995 – Record of the Year (as producer of "Kiss From A Rose")
 Horn was appointed Commander of the Order of the British Empire (CBE) in the 2011 New Year Honours for services to the music industry.
 Honorary degree of Doctor of Music (2012) by Southampton Solent University, England.

References

Bibliography

External links

Official website

1949 births
20th-century English male singers
20th-century English singers
Art of Noise members
Brit Award winners
British music industry executives
British synth-pop new wave musicians
Commanders of the Order of the British Empire
English bass guitarists
English new wave musicians
English record producers
English songwriters
Grammy Award winners
Living people
Male bass guitarists
Male new wave singers
Musicians from County Durham
People from Durham, England
The Buggles members
The Trevor Horn Band members
Yes (band) members
ZTT Records